Rugby union in the Turks and Caicos Islands is a minor, but growing sport.

Governing body
The Turks and Caicos Islands Rugby Football Union is currently affiliated to NACRA (formerly NAWIRA), but not IRB.

History
Rugby in the Turks and Caicos Islands began in the early 1990s on Providenciale's old playing field. Due to the harsh nature of the terrain, and the lack of grass pitches, it was limited to touch rugby.

Touring parties were created and travelled first to Tamarac Florida and then on to the Dominican Republic and the Caribbean Sevens in Trinidad where they won the award for the most sociable team.

The TCIRFU was formed in 2001 and continues to grow through tours to Cuba, the Bahamas and the United States.

The Conch Cup is a regular home and away tournament held with the Bahamas national rugby union team.

See also  
 Turks and Caicos Islands national rugby union team
 Turks and Caicos Islands Rugby Football Union

References

External links
 Official union page
 NAWIRA T&C page
 TCIRFU Facebook

 
Sport in the Turks and Caicos Islands